The 1946–47 season was Colchester United's fifth season in their history and their fifth in the Southern League. Alongside competing in the Southern League, the club also participated in the FA Cup and Southern League Cup. New manager Ted Fenton began to assemble a team of professionals following the reliance on guest players during the 1945–46 season, as the club finished 8th in the league. They reached the first round of the FA Cup, but were defeated by Football League side Reading. They were also Southern League Cup semi-finalists, defeated at Priestfield Stadium by Gillingham.

Season overview
New manager Ted Fenton joined the club for the 1946–47 season. He was no stranger to Layer Road, having turned out for Colchester Town in the 1930s whilst a teenager. Fenton's contacts meant that he could quickly assemble a squad of professionals following the war years, which would eventually include 28 part-time professionals. The team would finish mid-table during Fenton's first season.

During the season, the stadium had its Main Stand extended, and the property behind what would become the Barside was purchased to overcome disputes regarding access by supporters to that side of the ground. At the end of the season, the Popular Side stand was demolished, and the timbers were reused to improve the Layer Road End. Meanwhile, the Main Stand had a boundary wall built that would prevent supporters attempting to enter the ground without paying.

Players

Transfers

In

Out

 Total incoming:  ~ £250

Match details

Friendlies

Southern League

League table

Matches

Southern League Cup

FA Cup

Squad statistics

Appearances and goals

|-
!colspan="14"|Players who appeared for Colchester who left during the season

|}

Goalscorers

Disciplinary record

Captains
Number of games played as team captain.

Clean sheets
Number of games goalkeepers kept a clean sheet.

Player debuts
Players making their first-team Colchester United debut in a fully competitive match.

See also
List of Colchester United F.C. seasons

References

General

Specific

1946-47
English football clubs 1946–47 season